The men's 10,000 metres at the 2006 European Athletics Championships were held at the Ullevi on August 8.

After an attempted breakaway started by Swiss Christian Belz with one and a half laps to go, Martínez and de la Ossa caught up with him, with German Fitschen falling away but catching up again before the final curve. He then outsprinted the two Spaniards to take a "shock" gold.

Medalists

Schedule

Results

Final

References

External links
Results

10000
10,000 metres at the European Athletics Championships
Marathons in Sweden